The United States Space Force's Global Positioning Systems Directorate is a unit of the Space and Missile Systems Center located at Los Angeles AFB, California.

Mission 
To develop, produce and maintain the fleet of Global Positioning System satellites, their associated ground control equipment, and end-user technologies. The day-to-day operations of the GPS network are handled by the 50th Space Wing.

History

Previous designations 
 GPS Joint Program Office (JPO) 1973–2006
 Global Positioning Systems Wing(GPSW) 2006-

Bases stationed 
 Los Angeles AFB, California

List of directors 
 Col  Wesley Ballenger Jr., ~2003–June 18, 2007
 Col David Madden, June 18, 2007–July 2010
 Col Bernard Gruber, July 2010–June 13, 2013
 Col William Cooley, June 13, 2013 – July 8, 2015
 Col Steven P. Whitney, July 8, 2015–June 2019
 Col John C. Claxton

References

External links
 GPSW Fact Sheet
 2007 July Interview with Col. David Madden  Inside GNSS

Military units and formations in California
Units and formations of the United States Space Force